Madonna and Child with Saint Catherine and Saint Nicholas is a 1510-1517 oil on canvas painting by Cima da Conegliano, now on long-term loan to the Yale University Art Gallery from the Barker Welfare Foundation in memory of Catherine Barker and Charles V. Hickox.

References

1510s paintings
Paintings of Catherine of Alexandria
Paintings of Saint Nicholas
Paintings in the Yale University Art Gallery
Paintings of the Madonna and Child by Cima da Conegliano